Jock of the Side or Jock O' the Side is a Child Ballad known as Child Balad 187, a border ballad, existing in several variants. It is part of the series of 305 traditional child ballads in England and Scotland. The rescue it depicts is recorded solely in popular tradition, although Jock of the Side himself appears to have existed.

Synopsis

A failed raid results in the capture of Jock of the Side. Hobie Noble—in some variants his illegitimate half-brother, and in some an outlawed Englishman—set out with few men to rescue him.  They sneak into the castle, over the hall or by murdering the porter, and find and rescue him.  They must carry him off in his chains, but they get him away.  In some variant, once they have escaped by crossing a river, the former captor asks for the chains back, but the prisoner says he will use them to shoe horses.

See also
Archie o Cawfield

External links
Jock o the Side
Jock O' The Side
commentary by Sir Walter Scott

Child Ballads
Border ballads
Northumbrian folklore
Scottish outlaws
English outlaws
Year of song unknown